An election was held on November 8, 1927 to fill the 72 seats of the New York City Board of Aldermen, in addition to elections to the New York State Assembly and various other questions on the ballot. 66 Democrats and 6 Republicans were elected to the Board. Brooklyn lost its sole Republican alderman.

References

Aldermanic election
New York City aldermanic election
New York City Council elections
New York City aldermanic election
New York City aldermanic election